The Old Nazareth Academy at 105 W. Church in Victoria, Texas was built in 1904.  It served as a church school.

It was "a fanciful two-and-one half-story brick classroom building" designed by architect Jules Leffland.  It was used by the Nazareth Academy from 1905 to 1951.

It was built by contractors Guithier & Mitchell. It was listed on the National Register of Historic Places in 1986.

See also

National Register of Historic Places listings in Victoria County, Texas

References

External links
Flickr photo
our story

School buildings on the National Register of Historic Places in Texas
School buildings completed in 1904
Buildings and structures in Victoria, Texas
Defunct schools in Texas
National Register of Historic Places in Victoria, Texas
1904 establishments in Texas